Honey Grove High School is a 2A public high school located in Honey Grove, Texas, a small community in the northeast portion of the state. The school is part of the Honey Grove Independent School District, which encompasses eastern Fannin County. In 2013, the school was rated "Improvement Required" by the Texas Education Agency.

Athletics
The Honey Grove Warriors compete in the following sports -

Baseball
Basketball
Cross Country
Football
Golf
Powerlifting
Softball
Tennis
Track and Field

State finalists

Girls Basketball - 
1991(2A)

References

External links
 

Schools in Fannin County, Texas
Public high schools in Texas